Charlap is a surname. Notable people with the surname include:

 Bill Charlap (born 1966), American jazz pianist
 Moose Charlap (1928–1974), American Broadway composer
 Yaakov Moshe Charlap (1882–1951), Orthodox rabbi